Scotts Corner (formerly, Scott's Corner) is an unincorporated community in Alameda County, California. It is 1 mile (1.6 km) east-southeast of Sunol, at an elevation of 259 feet (79 m). The name is in honor of Thomas Scott, Sr., who opened a store here in the 1850s.

References

External links

Unincorporated communities in California
Unincorporated communities in Alameda County, California